Jung Yeon-kyung (born 27 August 1982) is a South Korean badminton player. She was part of the Korean junior team that won the silver medal at the 2000 Asian Junior Championships, and also clinched the bronze medal in the girls' doubles event. Jung who educated at the Haksan Girls' High School, competed at the 2000 World Junior Championships, and won the mixed team silver medal after being defeated by Chinese team in the final. Jung later joined the Samsung Electro-Mechanics team, and won the women's doubles title at the 2003 Noonnoppi Cup Badminton Super Series partnered with Chung Jae-hee.

Achievements

Asian Junior Championships 
Girls' doubles

BWF International 
Women's doubles

Mixed doubles

References

External links 
 

1982 births
Living people
South Korean female badminton players
21st-century South Korean women